Brachylomia populi is a moth of the family Noctuidae first described by Strecker in 1898. It is found in the inland mountains of western North America, from British Columbia and Alberta and to the south through Colorado and Utah into Arizona.

The wingspan is about 30 mm.

Larvae feed on leaves of cottonwood and aspen in the genus Populus and are also reported on Quercus species.

References

Brachylomia
Moths of North America
Moths described in 1898